The XVIII World Rhythmic Gymnastics Championships were held in Paris, France on October 6–9, 1994.

Medal winners

Individual

All-Around

Ball

Hoop

Clubs

Ribbon

Groups

All-Around

6 Ropes Final

4 Hoops + 2 Clubs Final

References

Rhythmic Gymnastics World Championships
Rhythmic Gymnastics Championships
World Rhythmic Gymnastics Championships
World Rhythmic Gymnastics Championships
International sports competitions hosted by Paris
World Rhythmic Gymnastics Championships
World Rhythmic Gymnastics Championships